Baharampur Lok Sabha constituency (earlier known as Berhampore) is one of the 543 parliamentary constituencies in India. The constituency centres on Baharampur in West Bengal. All the seven assembly segments of No. 10 Baharampur Lok Sabha constituency are in Murshidabad district.

Assembly segments

As per order of the Delimitation Commission in respect of the delimitation of constituencies in the West Bengal, parliamentary constituency no. 10 Baharampur is composed of the following assembly segments from 2009:

In 2004 Berhampore Lok Sabha constituency was composed of the following assembly segments:Naoda (assembly constituency no. 61), Berhampore (assembly constituency no. 63), Beldanga (assembly constituency no. 64), Kandi (assembly constituency no. 65), Barwan (assembly constituency no. 67), Bharatpur (assembly constituency no. 68), Ketugram (SC) (assembly constituency no. 282)

Members of Parliament

Election results

General election 2019

General election 2014

General election 2009

|-
! style="background-color:#E9E9E9;text-align:left;" width=225|Party
! style="background-color:#E9E9E9;text-align:right;" |Seats won
! style="background-color:#E9E9E9;text-align:right;" |Seat change
! style="background-color:#E9E9E9;text-align:right;" |Vote percentage
|-
| style="text-align:left;" |Trinamool Congress
| style="text-align:center;" | 19
| style="text-align:center;" | 18
| style="text-align:center;" | 39.3
|-
|-
| style="text-align:left;" |Communist Party of India (Marxist)
| style="text-align:center;" | 9
| style="text-align:center;" | 17
| style="text-align:center;" | 22.7
|-
| style="text-align:left;" |Communist Party of India
| style="text-align:center;" | 2
| style="text-align:center;" | 1
| style="text-align:center;" | 2.3
|-
| style="text-align:left;" |Revolutionary Socialist Party
| style="text-align:center;" | 2
| style="text-align:center;" | 1
| style="text-align:center;" | 2.4
|-
| style="text-align:left;" |Forward Bloc
| style="text-align:center;" | 2
| style="text-align:center;" | 1
| style="text-align:center;" | 2.1
|-
| style="text-align:left;" |Indian National Congress
| style="text-align:center;" | 6
| style="text-align:center;" | 
| style="text-align:center;" | 9.6
|-
| style="text-align:left;" |Bharatiya Janata Party
| style="text-align:center;" | 1
| style="text-align:center;" | 1
| style="text-align:center;" | 16.8
|-
| style="text-align:left;" |Socialist Unity Centre of India (Communist) 
| style="text-align:center;" | 1
| style="text-align:center;" | 1
| style="text-align:center;" | 0.7
|-
|}
Source:    Party-wise trends in General Election to the Lok Sabha 2009  List of successful candidates in General Elections 2009 to the 15th Lok Sabha

General election 2004

General election 1999

General election 1998

General election 1996

1994 By-election
In the Behrampore seat, the by-election was held due to the death of the sitting RSP-MP Nani Bhattacharya on 11 October 1993. The by-election was held on 12 March 1994. Pramothes Mukherjee of RSP defeated Siddhartha Shankar Ray of Congress.

General elections 1951-2019
Most of the contests were multi-cornered. However, only winners and runners-up are mentioned below:

See also
 Baharampur, also known as Berhampore
 List of Constituencies of the Lok Sabha

References

Lok Sabha constituencies in West Bengal
Politics of Murshidabad district